Ndoe, or Ekparabong-Balep, is the most divergent of the Ekoid languages of Nigeria and Cameroon.

References

External links
Ekparabong-Balep basic lexicon at the Global Lexicostatistical Database

Ekoid languages
Languages of Nigeria
Languages of Cameroon